Rovagnate is a frazione in the  comune (municipality) of La Valletta Brianza, in the Province of Lecco in the Italian region Lombardy, located about  northeast of Milan and about  south of Lecco. It was an autonomous commune until 30 November 2014, when it merged with Perego to form the commune of La Valletta Brianza.

 
 

Frazioni of the Province of Lecco